Atla vitikainenii is a species of saxicolous (rock-dwelling) in the family Verrucariaceae. Found in northern Finland, it was formally described as a new species in 2016 by Juha Pykälä and Leena Myllys. The species epithet honours Finnish lichenologist Orvo Vitikainen, who, according to the authors, "has contributed in many ways to our knowledge of the taxonomy, ecology and biogeography of Finnish lichens".

References

Verrucariales
Lichen species
Lichens described in 2016
Lichens of Northern Europe